Pchyolka is a rural locality (a village) in Leninsky Selsoviet, Kuyurgazinsky District, Bashkortostan, Russia. The population was 2 as of 2010. There are 5 streets.

Geography 
Pchyolka is located 33 km northeast of Yermolayevo (the district's administrative centre) by road. Bugulchan is the nearest rural locality.

References 

Rural localities in Kuyurgazinsky District